Methidathion is an organophosphate insecticide; its use is banned in the European Union and USA.

Methidathion has been used as an insecticide in many countries to control caterpillars of Indarbela quadrinotata.

In 2012, residues were found in Thai vegetables at levels 100 times the legal limit.  Thailand routinely uses many pesticides banned in the US and EU and in amounts far exceeding limits.

References

External links
 Extoxnet

Acetylcholinesterase inhibitors
Organophosphate insecticides
Thiadiazoles
Ethers
Phosphorodithioates